My Hero is a British television sitcom, created by Paul Mendelson, and produced by Big Bear Films for BBC One. The series, set in Northolt, west London, stars Ardal O'Hanlon as George Sunday, also known as "Thermoman", a dim-witted Ultronian superhero, and Emily Joyce as his human wife, Janet.

It initially gained consistent viewing figures for the BBC until the final series when O'Hanlon departed the role and ratings began to rapidly decline following the appointment of replacement James Dreyfus, ultimately leading to the series' cancellation.

Series overview

Episodes

Series 1 (2000)

Series 2 (2001)

Series 3 (2002)

Series 4 (2003)

Series 5 (2005)

Series 6 (2006)
Series six was the first and only series to feature James Dreyfus in the lead role, taking over from the outgoing Ardal O'Hanlon. Due to declining ratings, and the poor public reception to Dreyfus, the series was axed, leading to the final two episodes being broadcast on Sunday lunchtimes, rather than the prime-time slot on Friday evenings.

References

BBC-related lists
Lists of British sitcom episodes